Smoking section may refer to:

A section of a restaurant, airplane, or other space where smoking is permitted
The Smoking Section, column in Rolling Stone
Smokin' Section, album by Tom Scott (saxophonist)
Smokin' Section, Brent Mason and Randy Mason album 
"Smoking Section", song by St Vincent from Masseduction

See also
Inflight smoking
Smoking ban
Smoking room